Midgham Green is a hamlet in the civil parish of Midgham in the English county of Berkshire.

References 

Hamlets in Berkshire
West Berkshire District
Thatcham